The 1976 African Cup of Nations squads was well attended. Qualified African nations participated in the event as follows:

Egypt
Coach:  Burkhard Pape

Guinea
Coach:  Petre Moldoveanu

Ethiopia
Coach: Peter Schnittger

Uganda
Coach: David Otti

Morocco
Coach:  Virgil Mărdărescu

Nigeria
Coach:  Tiko Jelisavcic

Sudan
Coach: Ibrahim Kabir and  Ivan Yanko

Zaire
Coach:  Ștefan Stănculescu

References

External links

Africa Cup of Nations squads
1976 African Cup of Nations